Swaminathan Vaidyanathan (26 June 1904—11 January 1963), known by his stage name Serukulathur Sama, was an Indian stage and film actor who was primarily known for playing the role of the Hindu god Krishna in Tamil language Hindu mythological films of the 1930s and 1940s.

Early life
Born in the village Serukalathur in Thiruvarur district to Mirasudar (Manager of own farm) Vaidyanadhaiyer, his birth name was Swaminathan. When he was 5 years old his mother died and the father remarried. So Swaminathan went to live with his uncle in Thanjavur. He learned Carnatic music along with academic studies. After passing the S. S. L. C. examination, he married and begot 3 children. He went to Madras in search of employment. There he worked as a clerk for 2 months in the office of the Indian National Congress Party and then for 10 years in the Cosmopolitan Club.

Film career
He was a handsome person and had the ability to sing in bass voice. While he was working in the Cosmopolitan club he came in contact with a member of the club Ananthanarayanan Narayanan, who established Srinivasa Cinetone, the first sound recording studio of south India in Kilpauk. Narayanan introduced Swaminathan into films. Swaminathan, now known as Serukalathur Sama, had good looks and singing talent. He was cast as Lord Krishna in most of the films.

Film Producer and Director
With his success as an actor he embarked on production of films. He leased National Movietone Studio on Poonamallee High Road, Chennai and changed its name as Bharat Cinetone. His first production was Shylock, (Tamilized as Shailak) adapted from Shakespeare's The Merchant Of Venice. He directed the film along with his lawyer friend and signed as Sama-Ramu.

Filmography

References

1904 births
1963 deaths
Male actors in Tamil cinema